Corporal Joseph Davis (born May 22, 1838) was an American soldier who fought in the American Civil War. Davis received the country's highest award for bravery during combat, the Medal of Honor, for his action during the Second Battle of Franklin in Tennessee on 30 November 1864. He was honored with the award on 4 February 1865.

Biography
Davis was born in Monmouthshire, Wales on 22 May 1838. He enlisted into the 104th Ohio Infantry. His remains are interred at the Boatman Memorial Cemetery in Ohio.

Medal of Honor citation

See also
List of American Civil War Medal of Honor recipients: A–F

Notes

References

External links
 104th Ohio Infantry by Larry Stevens
 Northwest Ohio in the Civil War
 Battle of Utoy Creek

1838 births
Welsh-born Medal of Honor recipients
Welsh emigrants to the United States
People of Ohio in the American Civil War
Union Army officers
United States Army Medal of Honor recipients
American Civil War recipients of the Medal of Honor
Year of death missing